Abdul Malik is a Bangladeshi cardiologist and National Professor of Bangladesh. He is the first cardiac surgeon of united Pakistan. In 2004, he was awarded Independence Day Award (Shadhinata Padak), the highest state award by the Government of Bangladesh for contribution in medical science.

Description
He served as:
 Member, Expert Panel Committee of World Health Organization (WHO) on Cardiovascular Disease (from 1976 to 2000);
 Vice-president, Asian Pacific Society of Cardiology (from 1994 to 1999);
 Founder president, SAARC Cardiac Society;
 Founder President, National Heart Foundation (Bangladesh);
 Founder president, Bangladesh Cardiac Society (from 1980 to 2005);
 Member, Advisory Council, Bangladesh Cardiac Society;
 Chairman, Academic Council of National Heart Foundation Hospital and Research Institute;
 Honorary professor, Cardiology, National Heart Foundation Hospital and Research Institute, Dhaka, Bangladesh;
 President & Advisor (Honorary), National Heart Foundation of Bangladesh, National Center for Control of Rheumatic Fever and Heart Diseases, The Hypertension Committee;
 Member, Management Committee, Ibrahim Cardiac Hospital and Research Institute, Dhaka.
 Former Advisor, Ministry of Health & Family Welfare and Ministry of Religious Affairs (Caretaker Government of Bangladesh in 2001);
 Adviser to the Presidents since Ayub Khan till Hussain Muhammad Ershad, including Sheikh Mujibur Rahman and Ziaur Rahman.
 First cardiac surgeon of Pakistan

Family

Malik was born on 1 December 1929 in a Muslim family of Pashchimbhag, South Surma, Sylhet. He is the son of Moulvi Furqan Ali and Syeda Nurunnisa Khatun. Professor Malik's wife Mrs. Ashrafunnisa Khatun is a social worker. Malik has 3 children. His daughter Fazilatunnisa Malik is a M.B.B.S. (Dhaka Medical College), F.C.P.S. (Medicine), M.R.C.P (UK), F.R.C.P (Edinburgh), FACC. She is a professor of Cardiology and Senior Chief Consultant at National Heart Foundation Hospital & Research Institute, Dhaka. Malik's 1st son Mr. Masud Malik, M.Com. is an industrialist and 2nd son Mr. Manzur Malik, MSS, is a union researcher and working in Canada.

Education

Malik passed Matriculation Examination from Sylhet Government Pilot High School in 1947 with more than 75% marks, and Intermediate Examination from MC College, Sylhet in 1949 getting 11th position in whole Pakistan. He got admitted into Dhaka Medical College and passed MBBS in 1954 along with 4 other students. In 1955, he joined Pakistan Army Medical Corps and went to UK for higher education in 1963. There, he got the Membership of the Royal College of Physicians in 1964 from Glasgow. From 1964 to 1966, he received higher training in Cardiology at Hammersmith Hospital, Post Graduate Medical School London and some other hospitals in UK and returned to Pakistan in 1966.

Career

He established the first cardiac unit in Pakistan at the Military Hospital Rawalpindi in March 1966. The first open heart surgery in Pakistan was performed in March 1970 in this cardiac unit. For this achievement, he was awarded nationally and was promoted to lieutenant colonel. He joined the Institute of Post Graduate Medicine and Research, Dhaka (now Bangabandhu Sheikh Mujib Medical University) in June 1970 and established cardiac unit there. He served as Professor of Cardiology there from 1970 to 1978.

In 1978, Malik founded National Institute of Cardiovascular Diseases, Dhaka. He worked there as founder director cum professor until 1989. The first open heart surgery in Bangladesh was done on 18 September 1981 in this institution.

In 1978, Malik founded National Heart Foundation of Bangladesh. He is still working there as the founder Secretary General (honorary). It is a non-government and non-profit organisation with 32 affiliated bodies. The foundation is affiliated with World Heart Federation. The Foundation has established a 300-bed cardiac hospital in Mirpur, Dhaka having all types of modern investigations and treatments, open heart surgery, including coronary bypass surgery. This hospital run programs in MD( cardiology), MS (cardiothoracic surgery), nursing, and also provides courses in many other medical technology fields.

He established National Center for Control of Rheumatic Fever and Heart Diseases. Here, he was the project director from 1987 to 1989.

Malik is a Fellow of Royal College of Physicians of Edinburgh Scotland; Fellow of Bangladesh College of Physicians & Surgeons, Bangladesh; Fellow of American College of Cardiology and the Fellow of American College of Chest Physicians (USA).

He has got the highest state award from the Government of Bangladesh, the Independence Day Award (Shadhinata Padak) in 2004 for contribution in Health Education and Medical Science. In 2006, he was awarded "National Professor" by the Government of Bangladesh for contribution in Health Education and Medical Science.

Awards
 Independence Day Award (Shadhinata Padak), 2004, Highest state award by Government of Bangladesh (for contribution in Health Education and Medical Science)
 National Professor, 2006, by Government of Bangladesh (for contribution in Health Education and Medical Science)
 Sandoz Gold Award, 2008, by Novartis Bangladesh

Works
Malik has written two books named Alor Poth and Jiboner Kichhu Katha in Bangla. The copyrights of these books have been donated to National Heart Foundation Hospital & Research Institute, Dhaka and the revenue earnings from these are deposited in the charitable fund named "The Lillah Fund" to bear the treatment cost of poor patients.

References

Living people
Fellows of the Royal College of Surgeons
National Professors of Bangladesh
Recipients of the Independence Day Award
1929 births
Advisors of Caretaker Government of Bangladesh
Dhaka Medical College alumni
Pakistan Army officers
Fellows of the American College of Cardiology
Murari Chand College alumni
People from Dakshin Surma Upazila